Zindagi Dhoop Tum Ghana Saya is a Pakistani drama television series which premiered on ARY Digital on 19 February 2011. The serial was televised every Saturday at 8:00 p.m. (PST). The serial is directed by Syed Atif Hussain, written by Faiza Iftikhar, and produced by Humayun Saeed and Abdullah Kadwani's production house 7th Sky Entertainment. The Show was also aired on SET UK.

Cast and characters
 Sanam Baloch as Hira
 Sindhyar Memon as a Baby
 Sami Khan
 Fahad Mustafa as Mazhar
 Qavi Khan as Akbar
 Shabbir Jan as Naveed
 Deeba Begum as Shamshad Begum
 Shagufta Ejaz as Rizwana
 Rashid Farooqui as Hafeez
 Hasan Ahmed

Crew
 Written by : Faiza Iftikhar
 Directed by : Atif Hussain
 Produced by : Humayun Saeed and Abdullah Kadwani (7th Sky Entertainment)

Plot
The story of Zindagi Dhoop Tum Ghana Saya revolves around Hira (Sanam Baloch) who is from a middle-class background and whose parents died when she was just a child. She had led a very tough life and faced many disappointments. However, her disappointments were over when she married Mazhar (Fahad Mustafa) who belonged to a very well-off family and proved to be a very loving husband. Mazhar's family makes things difficult for her but Mazhar's love is enough for her.

Within a year and a half, Mazhar dies in a car accident. Life again becomes very difficult for Hira. Hira's sister in law Rizwana (Shugufta Ejaz) wants to grab power and control in her brother's house. She poisons her parents against Hira. Soon Hira is thrown out of the house. In our society, life is not easy for a young widow. Hira is then married off to Naveed (Shabbir Jan), a widower, and starts a new period of suffering.

References

External links

 

Pakistani drama television series
Urdu-language television shows
Television shows set in Karachi
ARY Digital original programming